Carranza y Berndhart, S.L., better known by its trading name Sociedad Hispano-Marroquí de Transportes (HISMA) ("Spanish-Moroccan Transport Company"), was a Spanish-German dummy company set up by Nazi Party, through the German businessman Johannes Franz Bernhardt, to supply the National faction with arms during the course of the Spanish Civil War.

The company was constituted on 31 July 1936 in the city of Tétouan, capital of the Spanish protectorate of Morocco, with an initial investment of 200,000 pesetas.

See also
 German involvement in the Spanish Civil War 
 Condor Legion

References

Spanish companies established in 1936
Spanish companies disestablished in 1945
Organisations of the Spanish Civil War
1936 establishments in Morocco
1945 disestablishments in Morocco
Front organizations

de:Johannes Bernhardt#Compañía Hispano-Marroquí de Transportes Limitada